Lindsay Davenport and Corina Morariu were the defending champions but lost in the quarterfinals to Virginia Ruano Pascual and Paola Suárez.

Nicole Arendt and Ai Sugiyama won in the final 6–4, 6–4 against Ruano Pascual and Suárez.

Seeds
Champion seeds are indicated in bold text while text in italics indicates the round in which those seeds were eliminated.

Draw

Final

Top half

Bottom half

References

External links
 2001 Indian Wells Masters Draw (Archived 2009-07-22)

2001 Indian Wells Masters
Doubles